Tomislav Labudović (born 25 October 1985) is a Croatian football player who plays for FSG Bebra in Germany.

Club career

Labudović started his football career at NK Zagreb in the Croatian First Division.

Between 2004 and 2009, under the guidance of Miroslav Blažević and Mile Petković, he established himself as a young player of great potential and talent, as a leader in the game, who knows how to score a goal and assist, and enrolled in 125 appearances for Croatian First Division  with his 23 years.

During 2004–05 season he scored five goals in five games in a row and became a standard player in "Player of the round2.

In summer 2008, NK Zagreb refused an offer from Turkish club MKE Ankaragücü and Israeli club FC Ashdod and offered Labudović a new contract which he refused. The club put him to the bench. In winter 2009, Labudović was loaned out to HNK Šibenik (Croatian First Division) playing 10 matches.

On 31 August 2009, last day of the transfer window, Labudović terminated his contract with NK Zagreb and Croatia Sesvete (Croatian First Division), where he played eight games. He left the club at the end of the year because  of the club's financial collapse. He was acquitted for the second time for alleged bribery of two traffic officers after a traffic offence in February 2009.

In 2010, he joined NK Inter Zaprešić where he played at a high level eight matches under the guidance of coach Ilija Lončarević, and he was again standard in "Player of the round".

In  2011, he joined Indonesian outfit Persiba Balikpapanon a one-year contract for season 2011–12. Labudović played 30 matches and scored one goal. In 2013, he moved to NK Pomorac Kostrena, where he played 25 matches and scored 2 goals. Before the season 2014/2015, he signed for HNK Gorica.

International career
During 2001 he was standard player of Croatian national team U-17. 
He played three qualifying matches for Euro U-17 with the results:

24 September 2001. Croatia-Albania 5–2;

26 September 2001 Hungary-Croatia 1:1;

28 September 2001 Croatia-Azerbaijan 2:0;

During the 2005–06 season he played qualifying matches for the U-21 Euro for Croatia.

References

External links
 
Goal for Persiba Balikpapan Season 2011/2012 
Tomislav Labudović Promo Video Link on YouTube
Fieldoo Profile
Tomislav Labudović Profile on Croatian football federation site
Tomislav Labudović profile at Nogometni Magazin

Newspapers
Contract with NK Pomorac Kostrena
First place in league 2013 
New contract (2011)
 Deal Labudović! newspapers about Tomislav Labudović (2011)
Tomislav Labudović transfer to fc Persiba Balikpapan (year 2011)
Tomislav Labudović interview for top Croatian web site index.hr (year 2009)
Tomislav Labudović interview for top Croatian web site index.hr (year 2010) 
Tomislav Labudović sign in to FC Slaven Belupo (year 2010)
Tomislav Labudović on loan in FC Šibenik (year 2009)
Tomislav Labudović in FC Zagreb (year 2009)

1985 births
Living people
Footballers from Zagreb
Association football central defenders
Croatian footballers
Croatia youth international footballers
Croatia under-21 international footballers
NK Zagreb players
HNK Šibenik players
NK Croatia Sesvete players
NK Inter Zaprešić players
NK Slaven Belupo players
Budapest Honvéd FC players
Persiba Balikpapan players
NK Pomorac 1921 players
HNK Gorica players
Croatian Football League players
Nemzeti Bajnokság I players
Liga 1 (Indonesia) players
First Football League (Croatia) players
Croatian expatriate footballers
Expatriate footballers in Hungary
Croatian expatriate sportspeople in Hungary
Expatriate footballers in Indonesia
Croatian expatriate sportspeople in Indonesia
Expatriate footballers in Germany
Croatian expatriate sportspeople in Germany